Mark Mancina is an American film composer. A veteran of Hans Zimmer's Media Ventures, Mancina has scored over sixty films and television series including Speed, Bad Boys, Twister, Tarzan, Training Day, Brother Bear, Criminal Minds, Blood+, and Moana.

He has made several collaborations with The Walt Disney Company, and has won two Grammy Awards, and was nominated for an Annie Award for Brother Bear. For his work on the Disney Theatrical Productions adaptation of The Lion King, he was nominated for a Tony Award for Best Original Score in a Musical.

Career 
Mancina has worked primarily as a composer for Hollywood soundtracks, such as his collaboration with Trevor Rabin on the soundtrack for Con Air. He arranged many of the songs behind Disney's The Lion King (while Hans Zimmer wrote the orchestral score with Nick Glennie-Smith and Lebo M. for the African chants) including the Broadway musical. He composed the score for the thriller Twister (1996) and the action films Speed (1994) and Bad Boys (1995). Mancina co-wrote several songs for Hanna-Barbera's 1990 animated film Jetsons: The Movie.

Mancina collaborated with John Van Tongeren to write the theme to the 1995 revival of The Outer Limits. They both scored ten episodes for the first season of the show.  He collaborated with Phil Collins on two Disney animated feature films, Tarzan (for which soundtrack he and Collins received a Grammy Award for Best Soundtrack Album) and Brother Bear. Mancina wrote and composed the arrangement of "When You Wish Upon a Star" from 2006 to 2022 for the previous Disney logo and was co-arranged with and orchestrated by David Metzger. Furthermore, he composed the music of the Disneynature logo.

Mancina composed the music for the  2005–06 anime television series Blood+, which had music produced by Hans Zimmer. Additionally in television, he composed score for Criminal Minds and Soldier Of Fortune, Inc.

Mancina has contributed to a number of progressive rock projects. He toured with Trevor Rabin in support of Can't Look Away and went on to produce tracks on the Yes album Union in 1991. He worked with Emerson, Lake & Palmer, as he coproduced their 1992 album, Black Moon, and he also wrote one song Burning Bridges on this record.

With playwright Glen Berger, Mancina has written a musical based on the film August Rush, for which he had written the score. Mancina and Berger cowrote the lyrics for the musical, with Mancina writing the music and Berger writing the book.  Under the direction of John Doyle, it received its world premiere at the Paramount Theatre in Aurora, Illinois in May 2019.

Although he did not participate in the 2020 film Bad Boys for Life, his original theme for Bad Boys is used heavily throughout the film as well as the end credits.

Personal life 
He resides in Carmel, California, with his wife and daughter. Trained as a classical guitarist, he is an avid guitar player and rare instrument collector.

Discography

Film

1980s

1990s

2000s

2010s

2020s

Television

Theatre

Video games

See also 
 :Category:Mark Mancina songs

References

External links 
The Music of Mark Mancina (official website)

BroadwayWorld.com interview with Mark Mancina, November 26, 2007

American film score composers
American male film score composers
American music arrangers
American people of Italian descent
American television composers
Animated film score composers
Anime composers
Grammy Award winners
La-La Land Records artists
Living people
Male television composers
Musicians from Santa Monica, California
Record producers from California
Varèse Sarabande Records artists
Video game composers
Walt Disney Animation Studios people
Year of birth missing (living people)